Paul Butler (born 11 November 1988) is an English professional boxer and two-time bantamweight world champion, having held the IBF title in 2014 and the WBO title in 2022. He also held multiple regional titles, including the British and Commonwealth super-flyweight titles in 2012 and 2013, respectively.

Amateur career 
Butler won the 2010 Amateur Boxing Association British flyweight title, when boxing out of the Vauxhall Motors ABC.

Professional career

Career beginnings

Early career
Butler made his professional debut against Anwar Alfadi on 11 December 2010. He won the fight on points, after four rounds were contested. Butler amassed an 8–0 record during the next 23 months, with three of those victories coming by way of stoppage.

Butler faced John Donnelly for the vacant British super-flyweight title on 9 November 2012 at the Liverpool Olympia in Liverpool, England. Butler won the BoxNation broadcast bout by a first–round knockout. He floored Donnelly with a strike to the ribs after just 59 seconds, which left Donnelly unable to rise in time for the ten–count. During the post–fight drug test, Donnelly tested positive for benzoylecgonine.

Following a fourth–round technical knockout of Anwar Alfadi on 21 March 2013, Butler challenged Yaqub Kareem for the Commonwealth super-flyweight title on 20 April 2013, at the Wembley Arena in London, England. He won the fight by a fifth–round technical–knockout. Butler made his first and only Commonwealth title defense against Najah Ali on 28 June 2013. He won the fight by a fourth–round knockout.

Butler faced Miguel González for the vacant WBO Inter-Continental super-flyweight title on 21 September 2013. He won the fight by a dominant unanimous decision, with scores of 117–112, 119–110 and 120–108. Butler made the first defense of his secondary title defense against Ruben Montoya on 7 December 2013, with the vacant WBA Inter-Continental super-flyweight title being on the line as well. He once again won by unanimous decision, with scores of 120–108, 120–109 and 118–110.

Butler moved up to bantamweight for his next bout against Oreste Bernabe Nieva, which took place on 8 March 2014, with the vacant WBA Inter-Continental bantamweight title being on the line. He won the fight by a fourth–round knockout.

IBF bantamweight champion
Butler was scheduled to challenge the reigning IBF bantamweight champion Stuart Hall, in the latter's second title defense. The bout was scheduled for 7 June 2014, and took place at the Utilita Arena Newcastle in Newcastle, England, the champion's hometown. The bout was broadcast by BoxNation. Butler won the fight by split decision. Two judges scored the fight 117–111 and 115–113 for Butler, while the third judge scored it 115–113 for Hall. Butler had a slow start to fight, but appeared to take over as the fight progressed.

Butler faced Ismael Garnica in a non–title bout on 25 October 2014, at the Echo Arena in Liverpool, England. He dominated the fight from start to finish, and won by unanimous decision, with all three judges awarding him every single round of the bout. Following his victory against Garnica, Butler relinquished the IBF bantamweight title, in order to compete against fighters with whom he had size parity, stating "...I’m a natural 115 pounder".

Post championship career

Return to super-flyweight
After vacating the IBF bantamweight title, Butler moved back down to super–flyweight in order to challenge the reigning IBF super-flyweight champion Zolani Tete. The title bout was scheduled as the main event of a BoxNation broadcast card, which was held on 6 March 2015. Tete won the fight by an eight–round technical knockout. He floored Butler with two consecutive left uppercuts, which left the challenger unable to rise from the canvas in time to beat the ten count.

After suffering the first loss of his professional career, Butler jumped up in weight to super-bantamweight, in order to face Gustavo Molina on 11 July 2015. He won the fight by a fifth-round technical knockout. After successfully bouncing back from his loss to Tete, Butler returned to super-flyweight to face Hector Rolando Gusman on 3 October 2015. He won the fight by a first-round knockout, stopping Gusman with a body shot just thirty seconds into the bout.

Butler faced Silviu Olteanu for the vacant WBO European super-flyweight title on 19 December 2015. He won the fight by an eight-round technical knockout, stopping the Romanian with a well place hook to the body. Butler next faced Sebastian Sanchez for the vacant WBO International super-flyweight title on 12 March 2016. He won the fight by a ninth-round knockout.

Return to bantamweight

Butler vs. Ruiz 
Butler faced Alexis Ruiz on 22 October 2016, in his return to bantamweight. He won the fight on points.

Butler vs. Cazares 
Butler faced Alexander Cazares on 3 December 2016, and once again won the fight on points.

Butler vs. Ruiz 
Butler notched his second ever stoppage victory at bantamweight against Ruben Dario Ruiz on 8 April 2017, as he knocked Ruiz out in the fourth round.

Butler vs. Hall 
Butler faced Stuart Hall for the vacant WBA Continental bantamweight title on 17 September 2017. He won the fight by unanimous decision, with scores of 118-110, 118-110 and 117-111.

Butler vs. Rodriguez 
Butler was scheduled face the undefeated Emmanuel Rodríguez for the vacant IBF bantamweight title on 5 May 2018, at The O2 Arena, on the undercard of the Tony Bellew and David Haye cruiserweight rematch. Rodriguez was ranked #3 by the IBF at bantamweight at the time. Butler missed weight prior to the bout, which left him ineligible to win the vacant belt. He weighed in at 121.5 pounds, 3.5 pounds over the championship limit. Butler furthermore refused to weigh himself in a second attempt. Rodríguez won the fight by a dominant unanimous decision, with scores of 118-108, 120-106, 120-106. Butler was knocked down twice in the final minute of the first round, and failed to achieve much headway during the remaining eleven rounds.

Butler vs. Boyeaux 
Butler returned to action six months later, on 3 November 2018, to face Yoan Boyeaux. He won the fight on points.

Butler vs. Majiha 
Butler faced Fadhili Majiha on 30 March 2019, and again won the fight on points.

Butler vs. Sanchez 
Butler notched his first bantamweight stoppage victory in two years on 18 May 2019, knocking Salvador Hernandez Sanchez out in the sixth-round.

Butler vs. Reyes 
Butler faced the journeyman Joseafat Reyes on 22 September 2019, and won the fight on points.

Butler vs. Walker 
Butler's sole fight of 2020 came on 18 October, against Ryan Walker, whom he beat on points.

Butler vs. Garcia 
Butler was expected to face Joseph Agbeko for the vacant WBO International bantamweight title on 25 June 2021. Agbeko was forced to withdraw from the bout due to visa issues, and was replaced by Willibaldo Garcia. Butler won the fight by split decision, with scores of 96-94, 97-92 and 94-95.

Second bantamweight title reign

Butler vs. Sultan
Butler was booked to fight Jonas Sultan on 22 April 2022, at the M&S Bank Arena in Liverpool, England for the vacant WBO interim bantamweight title. Butler was originally scheduled to challenge WBO bantamweight champion John Riel Casimero in 11 December 2021 and 22 April 2022, before Casimero withdrew before the weigh-ins due to gastritis, and not being permitted by British Boxing Board of Control (BBBofC) due to medical guidelines violation, respectively. Sultan was ranked #10 by The Ring, #4 by the WBA, #4 by the WBO and #12 by the IBF at bantamweight. Butler captured the vacant title by unanimous decision, with scores of 116–112, 117–111 and 117–111, utilizing out-fighting tactics to control the fight for the majority of the bout. On May 4, the WBO officially stripped Casimero of the full title and elevated Butler from interim to full champion.

Butler vs. Inoue 

On 25 August 2022, it was announced that Butler would face undefeated WBA (Super), WBC, IBF, and The Ring bantamweight champion Naoya Inoue in a title unification bout. It took place on 13 December 2022, at the Ariake Arena in Tokyo, Japan, and was broadcast by Amazon Prime domestically and by ESPN+ in the United States. It was Butler's first fight outside of the United Kingdom. He lost the fight by 11th round KO.

Professional boxing record

See also
List of world bantamweight boxing champions
List of British world boxing champions

References

External links

Paul Butler - Profile, News Archive & Current Rankings at Box.Live

|-

|-

|-

|-

|-

|-

|-

1988 births
Living people
English male boxers
Sportspeople from Chester
People from Ellesmere Port
England Boxing champions
British Boxing Board of Control champions
Commonwealth Boxing Council champions
Flyweight boxers
Super-flyweight boxers
Bantamweight boxers
World bantamweight boxing champions
International Boxing Federation champions
World Boxing Organization champions